Beloyarovo is a rural locality (a selo) and the administrative center of Beloyarovsky Selsoviet of Mazanovsky District, Amur Oblast, Russia. The population was 907 as of 2018. There are 13 streets.

Geography 
Beloyarovo is located on the left bank of the Zeya River, 14 km southwest of Novokiyevsky Uval (the district's administrative centre) by road. Mazanovo is the nearest rural locality.

References 

Rural localities in Mazanovsky District